Al Maryah Island, formerly known as Sowwah Island, is a natural island located northeast of Abu Dhabi, the capital of the United Arab Emirates. It is named for a famous oasis region in Abu Dhabi, Al Mariyah, which in turn is named after the species of Arabian deer - Al Mariyah - which live there.

Al Maryah Island covers approximately 114 hectares and is currently being developed by Mubadala to be a new city center. It is one of the largest construction sites in Abu Dhabi. 

The center of the island is Abu Dhabi Global Market Square (formerly Sowwah Square), northeast of the city center of Abu Dhabi. Construction of Abu Dhabi Global Market Square started in 2007, and the first buildings opened in 2011. The island contains multiple towers and buildings, including Al Sila Tower, Abu Dhabi Securities Exchange, and Cleveland Clinic Abu Dhabi.

References

External links
 Official website

Central Region, Abu Dhabi
Free-trade zones of the United Arab Emirates
Neighborhoods of Abu Dhabi
Islands of the Emirate of Abu Dhabi
Buildings and structures under construction in the United Arab Emirates